Look Up is the debut studio album by American musician Mod Sun. It was released on March 10, 2015 through Rostrum Records. 

The album debuted at number 120 on the US Billboard 200.

Track listing

Charts

References

External links

Mod Sun albums
2015 debut albums
Rostrum Records albums